Jabriel Washington (born 1993) is an American football cornerback who is currently a free agent. He played college football at Alabama.

Personal life
A native of Jackson, Tennessee, he attended Trinity Christian Academy where he played both quarterback and free safety on the football team.

College career
After redshirting his initial year at Alabama, Washington recorded two assisted tackles in 2012.
In 2014, he made his first collegiate interception in a game against Florida.

Professional career
Washington signed with the Los Angeles Rams after going undrafted in the 2016 NFL Draft. On September 3, 2016, he was waived by the Rams as part of final roster cuts.

References

External links
Alabama Crimson Tide bio

1993 births
Living people
Sportspeople from Springfield, Ohio
American football linebackers
Alabama Crimson Tide football players